Gracita Arrindell (born 1956) is a Dutch politician, writer and women's rights activist, who was the first woman to be appointed President of the Parliament of Sint Maarten, a role she held for two terms.

Biography 
Born in Sint Maarten, she was awarded an MA degree in Political Science from the Catholic University, Nijmegen. In 1988, she became deputy secretary of the Island Council. In 1994 she was the chair of the  Constitutional Referendum Committee. In 1999 she was a candidate in the Island Council (IC) elections, representing the Democratic Party. However she later joined the People’s Progressive Alliance (PPA), who won their first seat in 2003.

Arrindell was the first woman to be elected President of the Parliament of Sint Maarten. She held the role of President for two terms: the first from 10 October 2010 to 14 July 2012; the second from 24 June 2013 to 9 October 2014. During her tenure she was also the leader of the PPA. She has spoken out against the nepotism that has been common in political appointments on the island.

In Looking Back to Move Forward, Arrindell edited a collection of speeches by former Prime Ministers of the Netherlands Antilles. She is president of the Peridot Foundation, an organisation she founded to combat domestic violence in Saba, Sint Eustasius and Sint Maarten. She was also chair of the Supervisory Board of Directors of the Princess Juliana International Airport.

Awards 
In 2009 she was recognised with an Emerald Award from the Women of Great Esteem (WGE) Organization.

References

External links 

 Gracita Arrindell Radio Commercial - Special Message for All Women

Living people
1956 births
Presidents of the Parliament of Sint Maarten
Members of the Parliament of Sint Maarten
Sint Maarten politicians
Sint Maarten women in politics
Dutch women's rights activists